Miguel Javier Tanton (born 5 July 1989) is a Filipino former footballer who plays as a midfielder. At the club level, he most recently played for Ceres–Negros in the Philippines Football League.

Early life
Tanton was born in Santa Clara, California in the United States on July 5, 1989.

International career
Tanton made a debut for the senior Philippine national football team on March 29, 2016 in a 2018 FIFA World Cup qualifiers match against North Korea. With OJ Porteria's suspension, Tanton was included as part of the starting eleven by head coach Thomas Dooley. He assisted Manuel Ott in making the second goal for the Philippines at the 84th minute. The match ended 3–2 in favor of the Philippines.

International goals
Scores and results list the Philippines' goal tally first.

Individual awards
2016 UFL Cup Best Midfielder

References

1989 births
Filipino footballers
American soccer players
Philippines international footballers
Soccer players from California
Sportspeople from Santa Clara, California
Citizens of the Philippines through descent
American sportspeople of Filipino descent
Association football midfielders
Kaya F.C. players
Living people
UE Vilassar de Mar players
2019 AFC Asian Cup players